Elaine Riley (January 15, 1917 – December 7, 2015) was an American film and television actress.

Early years
The daughter of Mr. and Mrs. A.B. Riley, Riley was born in East Liverpool, Ohio, on January 15, 1917. She won the Miss East Liverpool beauty title and was runner-up for the Miss Ohio title in 1937. Riley also was a graduate of the Traphagen School of Fashion, and was a model for Powers and Hattie Carnegie model in New York at the age of 18.

Using the name Elaine Gray, Riley sang with a dance-music orchestra in several cities, including Pittsburgh, Pennsylvania.

Film
Riley entered Hollywood in 1943 as an extra for RKO Pictures, debuting in Higher and Higher.  She left her job as secretary to the managing director of WINS radio in New York City to pursue her career in movies.

In 1946, she signed with Paramount Pictures, where she became a recurring leading lady for Hopalong Cassidy. She worked with stars such as William Boyd, Charles Laughton, Tim Holt and Gene Autry.

Television
Riley appeared in two episodes of The Lone Ranger and in The Lineup in an episode broadcast on January 4, 1957.
Riley also appeared as Mildred Stone in an episode of The Cisco Kid. She also appeared in Highway Patrol, Episode 101, "Reformation". She appeared in a Superman episode "The Atomic Captive" in 1958.

Later years
She retired from acting in 1960, having more than 70 credits to her name. In 2004, Elaine Riley won the Golden Boot Awards, which honour actors, actresses, and crew members who have made significant contributions to the genre of Western television and movies. She died on December 7, 2015, aged 98.

Personal life
In 1946, Riley married actor Richard Martin, whom she met on the set of a film. Their marriage lasted until his death in 1994.

Selected filmography

Gildersleeve on Broadway (1943) as Model
Higher and Higher (1944) as Bridesmaid
Show Business (1944) as Chorine
Step Lively (1944) as Lois
Two O'Clock Courage (1945) as Cigarette girl
You Came Along (1945) as Showgirl
The Stork Club (1945) as Deb
Monsieur Beaucaire (1946) (uncredited)
Variety Girl (1947) as Cashier
The Big Clock (1948) as Lily Gold
Beyond Glory (1948) as Nurse
False Paradise (1948) as Anne Larson
Every Girl Should Be Married (1948) as Young lady
Alias Nick Beal (1949) as Telephone girl
The Great Lover (1950) as Passenger
Rider from Tucson (1950) as Jane Whipple
Where Danger Lives (1950) as Nurse Bates
 The Hills of Utah (1951) as Karen McQueen
Sailor Beware (1952) as Commentator
Steel Town (1952) as Valerie
The Caddy (1953) as Bathing beauty
Pardners (1956) as Dance hall girl
Wanted Dead or Alive (1960) as Panama in "The Partners" episode

References

External links
 
 

1917 births
2015 deaths
American film actresses
American television actresses
People from East Liverpool, Ohio
Actresses from Ohio
20th-century American actresses
Place of death missing
Traphagen School of Fashion alumni
21st-century American women